Mom Chao Vodhyakara Varavarn (1900–1981) was a Thai prince and architect. He was among the first Thai architects to be educated in Europe, graduating from the University of Cambridge, and was an influential figure in the formation of the modern fields of architecture and architecture education in Thailand. He produced works both for the government and privately during the pre- and post-World War II periods, and served as Dean of the Faculty of Architecture at Chulalongkorn University from 1954 to 1964.

Notes

References

Further reading

Vodhyakara Varavarn
Vodhyakara Varavarn
Vodhyakara Varavarn
Alumni of the University of Cambridge
1900 births
1981 deaths
19th-century Chakri dynasty
20th-century Chakri dynasty